The 2022 International Champions Cup women's tournament was a friendly tournament of women's association football matches. It was the fourth edition of the Women's International Champions Cup and took place in Portland, Oregon, United States, from August 17 to 20, 2022. Portland Thorns FC was the defending champion.

Lyon emerged the winners, defeating Monterrey 4–0 in the final, while Chelsea won the third-place match.

Teams
On the basis of their results in 2022, four teams participated in the tournament.

Venue

Bracket

Matches

Semi-finals

Third place play-off

Final

Goalscorers

See also
Women's Champions League (UEFA)
National Women's Soccer League (United States)
Women's Super League (England)
Division 1 (France)

References

External links

2022 Women
2022 in women's association football
2022 in American women's soccer
August 2022 sports events in the United States